Lal Tip (The Red Point) is a 2012 romance film directed by Swapan Ahmed and produced by Impress Telefilm Limited and Benani Films. The film stars Emon and Kusum Sikder in lead roles. The film was released worldwide on 17 February 2012.

Cast 
 Emon as Arnob
 Kusum Sikder as Nidhi
 Benjamin Dupich as Laurent
 Ana Levis as Leena
 ATM Shamsuzzaman as Dada
 Shahidul Alam Sachchu as Sohel
 Mishu Sabbir
 Daniel Kramer
 Deborah Newman
 Natalie Fransasci
 Sohel Khan

Production 
The film was produced by Impress Telefilm Limited and Banani Films.

Filming 
Shooting locations included Paris, Bangkok, and Dhaka. Some shots were taken in India. The cast filmed in Bangkok and Cox's Bazar, where Emon and Kusum Sikder also shot a romantic song. 50% of the shots were done in France, and the rest were done in Thailand, Bangladesh, and India.

Casting 

Mamnun Hasan Emon was the first to sign into the film and was under Swapon Ahmed's direction for the second time. Kusum Sikder was signed to play the female lead, as Swapon Ahmed wanted a fresh face for his movie.

Soundtrack 

The soundtrack was composed by Fuad al Muqtadir. Two songs, Beshe Jai and Hariye Jawa Sapne, were released with the trailer. The promo video for all the songs were released on 27 December 2011. Samsung organized the film's music launch on 25 December 2011. The music was composed by Fuad al Muqtadir, Ibrar Tipu, and Arefin Rumey. Three time Academy Awards winner Morris Jar composed one song for the album.

Marketing 

Samsung and Channel i announced its association with Impress Telefilm Limited for their film Lal Tip.

Release 

Lal Tip was released worldwide on 17 February 2012. A red carpet premiere of Lal Tip was organised by Impress Telefim on 15 February 2012.

References

External links 
 
 

2012 films
2012 romance films
Bengali-language Bangladeshi films
Bangladeshi romance films
Films shot in Paris
Films shot in Thailand
Films scored by Fuad
Films scored by Ibrar Tipu
Films scored by Arfin Rumey
2010s Bengali-language films
Impress Telefilm films